Different World is the debut studio album by Norwegian record producer Alan Walker. It was released on 14 December 2018 through MER Musikk and Sony Music Entertainment and includes his successful 2015 single "Faded". The album also succeeds a trilogy of releases leading up to the album, entitled World of Walker, which consisted of the singles "All Falls Down", "Darkside" and "Diamond Heart".

Background 
Featuring artists such as Steve Aoki, Noah Cyrus, and Digital Farm Animals, the album is noted for its mixture of "recognizable releases" such as "Faded" with "new material" such as "Lost Control". Walker said of the album "It's an incredible feeling to be able to release my debut album, Different World. These last years were absolutely surreal, and I certainly never imagined it would get to that point when I started. very different for me. It's something I've worked on for some time, and I'm super excited to finally share with the world and hear the reaction of my fans!" A campaign for the album was launched, titled "#CreateADifferentWorld". It is to raise awareness regarding the theme of climate change.

Critical reception 
Dancing Astronaut wrote that the album "extends the fullest portrait of his distinctive sound" and described it as "a tightly threaded collection of songs, which articulates Walker's sonic artistry." Billboard described it as "turning bleating synth melodies into sing-alongs, melts warm Caribbean rhythms with hardstyle booms, and electrifies the dance floor as much as it aims for radio readiness."

Commercial performance 
According to Billboards mid-year report, the album has moved 93,000 equivalent album sales in United States and "Faded" has amassed 192,396,000 streams.

Track listingNotes'
  signifies a co-producer
  signifies a vocal producer
 "Intro" features background vocals from Emelie Hollow and Anna-Marie Kimber.
 "Sing Me to Sleep" features uncredited vocals from Iselin Solheim.
 "Alone" features uncredited vocals from Noonie Bao.
 "Faded" features uncredited vocals from Iselin Solheim.
 "The Spectre" features uncredited vocals from Jesper Borgen.

Charts

Weekly charts

Year-end charts

Certifications

References

2018 debut albums
Alan Walker (music producer) albums
Sony Music albums